Audio Visions was a commercial-free new-age music channel on XM Satellite Radio.  It was available in both the United States and Canada.  It was also heard on DirecTV channel 856 until November 12, 2008.

Programs on Audio Visions included, Night Vision, Audiovisions, Good Acousitcs, and KPFA's program, Hearts of Space.

In November 2008, Audio Visions was replaced with Sirius Satellite Radio's Spa on XM channel 72 as part of a merged channel line-up.

See also
XM Satellite Radio channel history

Defunct radio stations in the United States
Radio stations established in 2001
Radio stations disestablished in 2008